Jean-Paul Davis (born February 10, 1972) is a Canadian former professional ice hockey defenceman.

Davis attended the University of Guelph where he played with the Guelph Gryphons men's ice hockey team. For his outstanding play during the 1997–98 season, Davis was named the CIS Player of the year and was awarded the Senator Joseph A. Sullivan Trophy.
Dr. Davis currently resides in Sarnia, Ontario, Canada where he practices full scope Oral and Maxillofacial Surgery

Awards and honours

References

External links

1972 births
Living people
Bakersfield Condors (1998–2015) players
Canadian ice hockey defencemen
Guelph Storm players
Ice hockey people from Ontario
Las Vegas Thunder players
Oshawa Generals players
Sportspeople from Oshawa